Fenoughil District is a district of Adrar Province, Algeria. According to the 2008 census it has a population of 29,540.

Communes
The district is further divided into 3 communes:
Fenoughil
Tamentit
Tamest

References

Districts of Adrar Province